Quality is the debut studio album by American rapper Talib Kweli. The album was released on November 19, 2002, by Rawkus Records. It received wide critical acclaim and had some commercial appeal from the song "Get By", produced by Kanye West. Kludge magazine included it on their list of best albums of 2002.

Background
In 1998 Talib Kweli and Mos Def as duo Black Star released critically acclaimed album Mos Def & Talib Kweli Are Black Star. The duo planned to release their second album, but Mos Def was busy working on film The Italian Job. Meanwhile, Kweli decided to work on other projects. As part of Reflection Eternal duo with Hi-Tek he released Train of Thought in 2000. Then, following the success of his previous albums, Kweli decided to release his debut solo album.

The album was called Quality. In 2002 interview with Rolling Stone rapper explained the album's name:

According to Billboard, the album's title is also a pun on Kweli's similarly pronounced surname.

Release and promotion

Quality was released on November 19, 2002 (November 25 in the UK), by Rawkus Records. Despite Kweli still being considered an underground artist, the album was commercially successful. It peaked at number 21 on the Billboard 200 and number 6 on the Top R&B/Hip-Hop Albums chart. Three singles were released from the album; "Good to You"/"Put It in the Air", "Waitin' For The DJ"/"Guerilla Monsoon Rap" and "Get By". Despite positive reception, the first two singles failed to make any impact on mainstream charts, so the label decided to not release the third single, considering the song and its content not commercially viable. In response to this, Kweli and his manager made several copies of the single and sent it to a number of popular radio DJs across New York. With help from DJ Enuff, the team at Power 106, and many other local DJs, the single gained popularity through local airplay, and was eventually released by Rawkus. "Get By" received radio airplay in early 2003 and charted on the Billboard Hot 100, where it peaked at number 77, becoming Kweli's biggest solo hit. A music video for the song was later released and an official remix was recorded. The remix, featuring Kanye West, Mos Def, Jay Z, and Busta Rhymes, was aired for a short time on New York hip-hop radio, but did not receive an official release.

After the release of Quality, Kweli embarked on a tour in support of the album, where he was accompanied by friend and producer Kanye West as an opening act. At the time, West was considered a talented producer, but executives at West's label, Roc-A-Fella, did not feel he had potential as a solo rapper. Kweli allowed West to perform on stage with him during his concerts, giving West his first stage exposure to large crowds. West later expressed his gratitude to Kweli, saying that he owed a part of his early success to these performances.

Track listing
Credits adapted from the album's liner notes.

Notes
 signifies a co-producer

Sample credits
 "Get By" contains elements from "Sinnerman", written and performed by Nina Simone.
 "Shock Body" contains elements from "Diana in the Autumn Wind", written by Roger Karshner and Chuck Mangione, performed by Chuck Mangione.
 "Joy" contains elements from "I Get High", written by Curtis Mayfield, performed by Aretha Franklin.
 "Talk to You (Lil' Darlin')" contains replayed elements from "Can I", written by Hal Davis and Herman Griffith, performed by Eddie Kendricks.
 "Guerrilla Monsoon Rap" contains elements from "I Never Had It So Good", written by Eugene Record and Stan McKenny, performed by The Chi-Lites.
 "Good to You" contains elements from "Simply Beautiful", written and performed by Al Green.
 "Won't You Stay" contains replayed elements from "Devil's Triangle", written by Wilbur Bascomb and Max Romer, performed by Wilbur Bascomb.  It also contains re-sung elements from "Strobelite Honey", written by William McLean, Andres Titus, Harold Clayton, Sigidi Abdullah, Waung Hankerson, William Young, Michael Young; performed by Black Sheep.

Personnel
Credits adapted from the album's liner notes.

 Geoff Allen – engineer 
 Teodross Avery – saxophone 
 Ayatollah – producer 
 Bilal – featured performer 
 Black Thought – featured performer 
 Maryham Blacksher – viola 
 Vernetta Bobien – background vocals 
 Randy Bowland – guitar 
 Tom Brick – mastering
 Marco Bruno – assistant engineer 
 Dave Chappelle – performer 
 James Clark – keyboards 
 Cocoa Brovaz – featured performers 
 Erick Coomes – bass 
 Morgan Michael Craft – guitar 
 Dave Dar – engineer , mixing 
 Dahoud Darien – producer 
 Abby Dobson – background vocals 
 Duane Eubanks – trumpet 
 G-Man – mixing assistant 
 Serban Ghenea – mixing 
 Savion Glover – tap dance 
 Chinua Hawk – background vocals 
 J Dilla – producer 
 Junior Cat – intro vocals 
 Eric Krasno – producer 
 Talib Kweli – main performer, co-producer , arranger , executive producer
 Stephanie McKay – chorus vocals 
 Megahertz – producer 
 Aisha Mike – additional vocals 
 Vinia Mojica – featured performer 
 Mos Def – featured performer 
 Joe Nardone – engineer , assistant engineer 
 Axel Niehaus – mixing 
 Novel – featured performer 
 Tiffany Phinazee – chorus vocals 
 Pino Palladino – bass 
 Pharoahe Monch – featured performer 
 Neil Pogue – engineer , mixing 
 James Poyser – keyboards 
 Emmanuel Pratt – violin 
 DJ Quik – featured performer, producer, and mixing 
 Michael Rapaport – skit performer 
 Res – featured performer 
 Kendra Ross – background vocals 
 Jeymes Samuel– background vocals 
 DJ Scratch – producer 
 Corey Smyth – executive producer
 The Soulquarians – producers 
 William Taylor – background vocals 
 Ahmir "?uestlove" Thompson – drums 
 Dave West – producer 
 Kanye West – producer , additional vocals 
 Doug Wimbish – bass 
 Xzibit – additional vocals

Chart positions

Weekly charts

Year-end charts

Singles

Certifications

References

External links

2002 debut albums
Talib Kweli albums
Rawkus Records albums
MCA Records albums
Albums produced by Kanye West
Albums produced by J Dilla
Albums produced by DJ Scratch
Albums produced by Ayatollah
Albums produced by Questlove
Albums produced by DJ Quik